Hidra may refer to:

Places
Hidra, Tunisia, a municipality in the Kasserine Governorate, Tunisia
Hidra, Vest-Agder, a former municipality in Vest-Agder county, Norway
Hidra (island), an island in Flekkefjord municipality in Agder county, Norway
Hidra Church, a church in Flekkefjord municipality in Agder county, Norway

Scientific Devices
Hybrid Illinois Device for Research and Applications, HIDRA, a toroidal fusion device at the University of Illinois Urbana-Champaign

See also
Hitra (disambiguation)
Hydra (disambiguation)